Dum Dum is a station of the Kolkata Metro. The metro station adjoins the platforms of the Dum Dum railway station where connections can be made with Indian Railways services.

History

Construction

The station

Structure
Dum Dum elevated metro station is situated on the Kolkata Metro Line 1 of Kolkata Metro.

Station layout

Facilities
ATM is available.

Connections

Auto
Auto rickshaw services available to Jessore Road at Nagerbazar, 30A Bus Stand and Barrackpore Trunk Road at Sinthi More, Milk Colony at Belgachia and Chiria More.

Bus
Bus route number 30B, 30B/1, 202, 219/1, DN9/1, S168 (Mini), S10, AC38 etc. by Dum Dum Road serve the station. Currently 30B, 30B/1, 202 do not serve the station due to change of their routes for Tala Bridge closure.

Train
It is connected to Dum Dum Junction railway station, is the meeting point Sealdah–Ranaghat line, Sealdah–Bangaon line and Grand Chord Link Line of Kolkata Suburban Railway.

Air
This is the closest metro station to Netaji Subhas Chandra Bose International Airport and is connected via Dum Dum Road and Jessore Road.

Entry/ Exit
North Gate and Main Gate on South Sinthee Road. Subway connections available from Platform No 1, 2, 3 and 4 of Dum Dum Junction railway station and Dum Dum Road.

South Gate leads to Dum Dum Road.

See also

Kolkata
List of Kolkata Metro stations
Transport in Kolkata
Kolkata Metro Rail Corporation
Kolkata Suburban Railway
Kolkata Monorail
Trams in Kolkata
Dum Dum
List of rapid transit systems
List of metro systems

References

External links

 
 Official Website for line 1
 UrbanRail.Net – descriptions of all metro systems in the world, each with a schematic map showing all stations.

Kolkata Metro stations
Railway stations in North 24 Parganas district
Railway stations opened in 1984
Airport railway stations in India